| top point scorer =  Liv McGoverne (Exeter) (137 points)
| top try scorer =  Lark Davies (Bristol) (14 tries)
| website    = www.premier15s.com
| prevseason = 2021–22
| nextseason = 2023–24
}}

The 2022–23 Premier 15s is the 6th season of the Premier 15s, the highest tier of English domestic women's rugby union competition (the 24th season including editions of the previous Women's Premiership), and the 3rd to be sponsored by Allianz.

The competition schedule was adapted to take place in a shortened timeframe, compared with previous seasons, in order to accommodate the 2021 Rugby World Cup.

For the second year running, the Allianz Cup will take place alongside the league, with fixtures for this cup competition scheduled within the international windows during the season.

Teams
As in previous Premier 15s seasons, 10 teams have been named to compete in the 2022–23 competition.

Table
As of 12 March 2023

Regular season
Fixtures for the season were announced by the Rugby Football Union on 17 August 2022.

Round 1

Round 2

Round 3

Round 4

Round 5

Round 6

Round 7

Round 8

Round 9

Round 10

Round 11

Round 12

Round 13

Round 14

Leading scorers
Note: Flags to the left of player names indicate national team as has been defined under World Rugby eligibility rules, or primary nationality for players who have not yet earned international senior caps. Players may hold one or more non-WR nationalities.

Most points

Most tries

Allianz Cup

The entire pool stage of the Allianz Cup contested before the start of the Premier 15s season. The Premier 15s clubs were ranked by their previous finishing position and drawn in two pools of five, with clubs playing each other once in two home games, two away games, one bye week over five rounds. The top two teams in each pool will progress to the semi-finals played at the highest ranked clubs' venues (16 April 2022) as well a third-placed play-off and final. The Allianz Cup final will be played at the home venue of the winning semi-finalist club with the highest points difference. In a change from he previous season, the teams ranked third and fourth in each pool also enter semi-finals as the first and second ranked teams instead of instant finals, which remains for the fifth ranked teams, which is to be played in two legs.

Pool stage

Pool A

Round 1

Round 2

Round 3

Round 4

Round 5

Pool B

Round 1

Round 2

Round 3

Round 4

Round 5

Finals

9th/10th place play-off

1st leg

2nd leg

5th-8th place play-off

Bracket

Semi-finals

Final

1st-4th place play-off

Bracket

Semi-finals

Final

Notes

References

Premier 15s